René Claude Meka is a senior Cameroonian officer and Chief of Staff of the Cameroon Armed Forces since September 2001.

Meka was born on February 2, 1939, in Enongal near Ebolowa. He graduated from the École spéciale militaire de Saint-Cyr in 1962 and from infantry school of Saint-Maixent in 1963.

During the border dispute between Cameroon and Nigeria over the Bakassi Peninsula, Meka was tasked with securing the territory by deploying the Rapid Intervention Battalion.

References

1939 births
Living people
People from South Region (Cameroon)
Cameroonian military personnel
École Spéciale Militaire de Saint-Cyr alumni